Pascal Denis (born May 20, 1975 in Repentigny, Quebec) is a Canadian former ice dancer. He competed with partner Josée Piché for 17 years, winning a bronze medal at the 2000 Canadian Figure Skating Championships and finishing 23rd at the 2004 World Figure Skating Championships, their final competition together. Denis later skated with Martine Patenaude.

Programs

With Patenaude

With Piché

Results 
GP: Grand Prix

With Patenaude

With Piché

References

External links
 
 

1975 births
Canadian male ice dancers
Living people
People from Repentigny, Quebec
Sportspeople from Quebec
20th-century Canadian people